Bangai may refer to several places in Nepal:

Bangai, Kapilvastu
Bangai, Rupandehi
Bangai Marchwar
Hati Bangai
Khadawa Bangai

See also
Bangui, Central African Republic
Bangai-O
Bangai-O Spirits
Banggai, a group of Indonesian islands